Kuyus (Kuyus) is a rural locality (a selo) and the administrative centre of Kuyusskoye Rural Settlement of Chemalsky District, the Altai Republic, Russia. The population was 210 as of 2016. There are 6 streets.

Geography 
Kuyus is located in the valley of the Katun River, 55 km south of Chemal (the district's administrative centre) by road. Oroktoy is the nearest rural locality.

References 

Rural localities in Chemalsky District